Macrochordion is a subgenus of the genus Aechmea.

Species
Species accepted by Encyclopedia of Bromeliads as of October 2022:

Aechmea alba 
Aechmea bromeliifolia 
Aechmea chlorophylla 
Aechmea lamarchei 
Aechmea maasii 
Aechmea maculata 
Aechmea triangularis

References

Plant subgenera